The Avigo 10 (the only model of Avigo ever produced) is a Personal Digital Assistant ("PDA") that was marketed by Texas Instruments from the years 1997 through 2000. It was sold as a lower-priced competitor to the Palm Pilot.

Technology

Like the Palm Pilot, the Avigo has a touch-sensitive monochrome LCD screen, and can synchronize with a host PC using either a docking cradle or an infrared wireless connection. Unlike the Pilot, it has no built-in handwriting recognition capabilities; instead relying on the "T9" brand predictive text entry software, in addition to an on-screen keyboard.

Physically, the Avigo is larger than the Palm Pilot series, but smaller than the earlier Apple Newton, measuring 5.5 in. X 3.25 in. X .75 in. The casing is plastic, with a charcoal-gray matte texture. It has a hard flip-cover to protect the screen when not in use.

Electronically, the Avigo has relatively modest computing power for a device from that era. The CPU is a modified 8-bit Z-80 microprocessor running at eight megahertz. It uses bank-switching to exceed the 64 kibibyte memory restriction; a stock Avigo is equipped with one megabyte of flash memory with 680 kilobytes available. The device is primarily powered by two AAA cell batteries, and uses a CR2025 lithium cell for RAM backup.

Some of the features of the Avigo that distinguish it from competing devices produced at the same time are:

 The aforementioned T9 predictive text input
 Support for running programs in the "landscape" orientation, in addition to "portrait"
 A larger screen than the Pilot, with no silk-screened writing area
 A built-in database application
 A slot for a memory expansion card (which expands the flash memory capacity to two megabytes)

External links
 Official Texas Instruments' Avigo Page
 Archive of software for the Avigo
 SDK for Avigo
 DataMath Calculator Museum: Additional info on Avigo

Texas Instruments computers
Personal digital assistants